A Basque Colombian is a person or resident born in Colombia of Basque descent. The term "Basque" may refer to ethnic Basques who immigrated to Colombia from the Basque Country.

Basques in the Paisa Region
The presence of Basque ancestry in the Paisa Region is exhibited by the proliferation of Basque surnames. Some scholars point out that this may be one of the regions of South America with the greatest concentration of ancestry from the Iberian region. The Basques began to arrive in Antioquia during the seventeenth century.

See also

Basque Argentine
Basque Mexican
Basque Americans
Spanish Colombian
White Latin American

References

Ethnic groups in Colombia
Basque diaspora in South America